List of cultural heritage landmarks of national significance in Kyiv — the capital city of Ukraine.

List of landmarks of national significance

Landmarks of history

Landmarks of archaeology

Landmarks of monumental art

Landmarks of urban planning

Landmarks of architecture

Landmarks of science and technology

Landmark ensembles
 Complex of landmarks at Baikove Cemetery (as landmark of history) featuring 87 landmarks
 Complex of landmarks of Lukianivske Cemetery (as landmark of history) featuring 4 landmarks
 Manor house of the Murashko family of artists (as landmark of history and architecture) featuring 3 landmarks

List of historic and cultural reserves

 National Reserve "Sophia of Kyiv" (historic and architectural)
 National Kyiv-Pechersk Historic and Cultural Reserve
 State Historic and Architectural Reserve "Ancient Kyiv"
 State Historic and Memorial Reserve of Lukianivka
 National Historic and Memorial Reserve "Bykivnia graves"

List of scientific objects of national inheritance (heritage)
Note: it is a mixed list that includes objects of both cultural heritage as well as natural heritage with emphasis on science.
 Automated information fund of scientific and research, research and design operations as well as defense of theses of the Ukrainian Institute of Information of Scientific Technology and Economy
 Aerodynamic complex based on subsonic wind tunnel TAD-2 of the National Aviation University
 Archive of manuscript funds of the Shevchenko Institute of Literature
 Archival scientific funds of manuscripts and phonographs of the Rylsky Institute of Art, Folklore and Ethnic Studies
 Bank of cell lines of the Bogomoletz Institute of Physiology
 Bank of strains of microorganisms for veterinary medicine of the Institute of Veterinary Medicine
 New generation diffractometric complex of the Kurdyumov Institute of Metal Physics
 Documents of pedagogical and psychological as well as historic and cultural directions of 19th - 20th centuries (1850–1917) of the Sukhomlynsky State Pedagogic Research Library
 Research and test site for material processing by explosion, utilization of ammunition and missiles of the Engineering Research Center "Metaloobrobka vybukhom"
 Experimental complex for hydrodynamical research of the Institute of Hydromechanics
 Bank of cell lines from human and animal tissues of the Kavetsky Institute of Experimental Pathology, Oncology and Radiobiology
 Collections of floral and ornamental plants and monocultural gardens of the Hryshko National Botanical Garden
 Collection of tropical and subtropical plants of the Hryshko National Botanical Garden
 Treasures of ancient history of Ukraine collection of the Institute of Archaeology
 Collection of embryonic plasma of plants of flora in Ukraine and rest of the World of the Institute of Cell Biology and Genetic Engineering
 Collection of microorganisms of the Zabolotny Institute of Microbiology and Virology
 Collection of old prints of the Ukrainian Pedagogic Museum
 Collection of valuable strains samples of winter wheat and corn - varieties, populations, and cell lines of unique mutant, recombinant and inbred of the Institute of Plant Physiology and Genetics 
 Collection of strains of pathogens of tularemia, anthrax, listeriosis, erysipeloid, pseudotuberculosis, diphtheria, brucellosis of the Central sanitary epidemiological station
 Collection of strains of microorganisms and cell lines of plants for food and agricultural biotechnology (Institute of Food Biotechnology and Genomics)
 Collection of strains of pathogenic microorganisms for animals of the National Center for Microorganism Strains (Department of Agrarian Policy)
 Complex of test stands for research of strength of materials and elements of designs in extreme conditions of thermopower loading of the Pysarenko Institute of Strength Problems
 Laser satellite rangefinders: "Kyiv-Holosiiv" of the Main Astronomical Observatory
 Museum of pathogenic microorganisms for humans of the Hromashevsky Institute of Epidemiology and Infectious Diseases
 Scientific zoological stock collections of the Schmalhausen Institute of Zoology
 Scientific funds and museum exposition of the National Museum of Natural Sciences
 Science and research complex of integrated, holographic and fiber optics of the Spetsprylad (Kyiv Arsenal Factory)
 Science and research complex of scanning tunnel and scanning electron microscopy for nanostructured studies of the Institute of Magnetism
 National reference base of the State Committee for Standardization, Metrology and Certification
 National dictionary database of the Ukrainian Language and Information Fund 
 National Herbarium of Ukraine (collection of plants) and collection of agaricomycotina (capped mushrooms) culture of the Kholodny Institute of Botany
 Complete and untouched fund of all types of released publications the State Archive printed by the Fedorov Book Chamber of Ukraine
 Firefight proving grounds of the Ukrainian Science and Research Institute of Fire Safety
 Publications fund that were published in the 19th century on agricultural topics of the National Agricultural Scientific Library
 Fund of manuscripts, old prints, rare publications, historical collections, Ukrainian archive fund and depository of the Vernadsky National Library of Ukraine
 Nuclear-physical installations: research nuclear reactor with "hot chambers", isochronous cyclotron "U-240" of the Institute for Nuclear Research Science Center

List of the UNESCO World Heritage Sites

 Kyiv: Saint-Sophia Cathedral and Related Monastic Buildings, Kyiv Pechersk Lavra (permanent inscription)
 Kyiv: Saint Sophia Cathedral with Related Monastic Buildings, St. Cyril's and St. Andrew's Churches, Kyiv-Pechersk Lavra (extension of Kyiv: Saint-Sophia Cathedral and Related Monastic Buildings, Kyiv-Pechersk Lavra; tentative list)

See also
 
 
 

References
 Rada.gov.ua: Objects of cultural heritage of national significance in the State Registry of Immobile Landmarks of Ukraine — 2009 Resolution of Cabinet of Ministers of Ukraine''.

 01
.
History of Kyiv
cultural heritage landmarks
.
.cultural heritage landmarks
History of Kyiv Oblast
Tourism in Kyiv
Kyiv